Adolfo Gonzales Chaves is a town in Buenos Aires Province, Argentina. It is the head town of the Adolfo Gonzales Chaves Partido.

History

 1886  The opening of the Buenos Aires Great Southern Railway line between Tandil and Tres Arroyos saw the construction of a railway station named "Estación Adolfo Gonzales Chaves".
June 20, 1906, the settlement was established on land donated by a politician named Adolfo Gonzales Chaves (1828-1887).
August 19, 1916, the Adolfo Gonzales Chaves Partido was created by Governor Marcelino Ugarte with land from the Juarez, Tres Arroyos and Necochea. 
October 28, 1960, the settlement was officially declared a city.

Economy

The main industry is based in the production of sunflower seeds and other grains.

Sports

In 2008, the 1st FAI South American Gliding Championships took place in Adolfo Gonzales Chaves in conjunction with the 55th National Gliding Championships.

Notable people
Mario David (1930-2001) - film director and screenwriter

References

External links

Local News (Spanish)
Local News (Spanish)

Populated places in Buenos Aires Province
Populated places established in 1906
1906 establishments in Argentina
Cities in Argentina
Argentina